Graeme Christopher Law (born 6 October 1984) is a Scottish former professional footballer who plays as a defender. He was most recently player-assistant coach for Tamworth.

Law played for York City, Dundee, Tamworth, Farsley Celtic and Northwich Victoria. He played in The Football League during the 2003–04 season for York and represented Scotland at under-19 level four times. Law most famously made the Dundee all time worst 11.

Club career

Tamworth
On 30 October 2007, Law returned to Staffordshire side Tamworth on loan. A month later it was confirmed that Law had signed a permanent deal to re-join Tamworth after impressing whilst on loan, signing a deal that would keep him at the club until the end of the 2007–08 season.

On 3 June 2008, Law agreed a new deal with Tamworth keeping him at the club until the end of the 2008–09 season, in which Tamworth were promoted to the Conference Premier after winning the Conference North championship.

Later career
In August 2009 he joined Stalybridge Celtic before in December 2010 switching to Northwich Victoria.

International career
Law made his debut for the Scotland under-19 team in a 2–1 victory over Switzerland on 25 September. He made three appearances in 2002 UEFA European Under-19 Football Championship qualification, finishing his under-19 career with four caps.

Coaching career
On 1 July 2012, Law returned to Tamworth, to work alongside his namesake Marcus as the club's new assistant coach.

Personal life
Law studied for a Bachelor of Arts degree in Physical Education and Sports Coaching at York St John University. In April 2016, his PhD paper on footballers, money and gambling received national press coverage.

Honours
Tamworth
Conference North: 2008–09

References

External links

1984 births
Living people
Footballers from Kirkcaldy
Scottish footballers
Scotland youth international footballers
Association football defenders
York City F.C. players
Dundee F.C. players
Tamworth F.C. players
Farsley Celtic A.F.C. players
Stalybridge Celtic F.C. players
Northwich Victoria F.C. players
English Football League players
National League (English football) players
Scottish Football League players
People associated with York St John University
Universiade silver medalists for Great Britain
Universiade medalists in football
Medalists at the 2011 Summer Universiade